The Diana Motors Company  was an early United States automobile manufacturing company. The company produced automobiles from 1925 to 1928.  The St. Louis based company was a subsidiary of the Moon Motor Car company. The company did not source its own components, rather, it produced "assembled" cars out of third party components. As of 2011, there were 12 known remaining vehicles produced by the company.

The Diana featured a Continental straight-8 engine and was primarily marketed to women. The car was billed as, "The easiest steering car in America".  Prices for the 1925 model started at $1,895.

See also 
 
Windsor (automobile)

References 
 
 
McConnell, Curt (1995). Great Cars of the Great Plains. University of Nebraska Press. 
 
 

1920s cars
Defunct motor vehicle manufacturers of the United States
Vehicle manufacturing companies established in 1925
1925 establishments in Missouri